The Métis Nation of Alberta (MNA) is a registered not-for-profit society in Alberta, Canada, that acts as a representative voice on behalf of Métis people within the province.

Formed in 1928 as the Métis Association of Alberta, its primary founding members were Felice Callihoo, Joseph Dion, James P. Brady, Malcolm Norris, and Peter Tompkins.

The MNA is led by a democratically elected "Provincial President", a position currently held by Audrey Poitras since 1996, as well as an elected Vice President (VP). The organization also has six regionally-elected presidents and vice presidents, who, together with the Provincial President and VP, make up the MNA's Provincial Council.

The organization and its 6 regional boards have branches that deal with unemployment, child services, land agreements, and the rights of Métis people as Aboriginal peoples in Canada (as recognized and affirmed in Section 35 of the Constitution Act, 1982).

The MNA currently has over 50,000 registered citizens. Alberta itself is home to eight Métis Settlements established by provincial legislation; many Métis Settlement members are also registered MNA citizens, but many are not. The Metis Settlements are the only secure Métis land base in Canada, resulting in Alberta having the largest population of declared Métis of any Canadian province.

History 

The Métis Nation within Alberta is an integral part of the larger Métis Nation—a distinct Indigenous people whose homeland stretches across west-central North America.

By the early 1800s, the Métis Nation emerged as a new and distinct Indigenous people in what is now western Canada. The Métis Nation developed its own group identity, language (Michif), culture, way of life, and forms of self-government throughout the inter-related communities and territory of their homeland. The Métis Nation Homeland spans present day Manitoba, Saskatchewan, and Alberta, and extends into Ontario, British Columbia, the Northwest Territories, and the northern United States.

Since the early 20th century, the Métis in Alberta have organized at the provincial level to advocate for the rights and interests that we hold together as an Aboriginal people.

In 1928, Felice Callihoo, Joseph Dion, James P. Brady, Malcolm Norris, and Peter Tompkins founded the Association des Métis Alberta et les Territoires du Nord-Ouest, which would later be known as the Métis Association of Alberta (MAA; later renamed the Métis Nation of Alberta). The organization would be the manifestation of the Métis Nation within Alberta's long struggle to have their self-government, rights, and interests recognized within the province.

In 1934, in response to MAA lobbying, Alberta appointed the "Half-breed Commission" to examine and report on Métis health, education, homelessness, and land issues. The MAA's leadership consistently attended the commission's hearings. After a two-year investigation, the Commission recommended that the province provide Métis with a secure land base and adequate services. In 1938, Alberta responded by adopting the Métis Population Betterment Act, which created the province's 12 original Métis colonies (between 1941 and 1960, Alberta rescinded four of these colonies).

In 1961, the MAA was first incorporated and registered under provincial legislation. This registration was mainly done because governments began making funding available to Indigenous representative organizations such as the MNA but insisted that such organizations be incorporated in order to be legally-recognized entities and obtain the funding available. MAA's leaders chose to incorporate the organization to act as a legal and administrative complement to Métis self-government.

In 1975, the Alberta Federation of Metis Settlements Association (FMS) was incorporated and registered under provincial legislation. It aimed to provide the remaining Métis colonies with a united voice. One of the FMS' earliest leaders, Adrian Hope, was a proud member of the MAA who had attended the hearings of the Half -breed Commission on the MAA's behalf and had served as MAA president from 1961 to 1967. The FMS negotiated with the Government of Alberta for increased political, cultural, social, and economic development on the eight remaining Métis colonies.

Ultimately, these negotiations culminated in the signing of the Alberta-Metis Settlements Accord in 1989. The following year, pursuant to the Accord, Alberta passed the Metis Settlements Act and related legislation, and granted the Metis Settlements General Council (MSGC) fee-simple title to the lands of what are now known as the Metis Settlements. This was done for the benefit of all Métis in Alberta:[T]his legislation is for all Métis of Alberta. Yes, it's directed to the settlements because that is in fact where the land base of 1.25 million acres is located, on the eight settlements. But any Métis can access membership and the rights to live and follow the Métis culture on these settlements...

The Métis Association of Alberta, which is more or less the umbrella group for off-settlement Métis, concurs in this process. That in itself is historic because the Métis community have come together on this process realizing that they all win, they all have access to it. So I don't think we're establishing two classes of people. That's not the intent. We're doing this for the Métis of Alberta ....The MNA has the only objectively verifiable registry of citizens of the Métis Nation within Alberta, a registry funded by the federal government, which is the level of government with constitutional responsibility for Métis. Citizens of the Metis Nation exist both on and off of the Metis Settlements and Métis Settlement membership, in of itself, does not necessarily identify rights-bearing citizens of the Métis Nation.

On 16 November 2017, the MNA and Canada signed a Framework Agreement that set the stage for self-government negotiations with the Métis Nation within Alberta. In particular, the Framework Agreement commits the parties to making best-efforts to reach a self-government agreement within two years (by 16 November 2019) that would provide for recognition of a constitution, which would establish the core functions of a self-government for the Métis Nation within Alberta. On June 27, 2019, the Government of Canada and the Métis Nation of Alberta signed a Métis Government Recognition and Self-Government Agreement (MGRSA) which recognizes the MNA as the government of the Metis Nation within Alberta and identifies the path for formalizing that recognition of the MNA as the government of the Métis Nation within Alberta within the Canadian legal system.

Organization and governance 
The Métis Nation of Alberta is led by a democratically elected "Provincial President," a position currently held by Audrey Poitras since 1996, as well as an elected Vice President (VP). The organization also has six regionally-elected presidents and vice presidents, who, together with the Provincial President and VP, make up the MNA's Provincial Council.

The organization has branches that deal with unemployment, child services, land agreements, and the rights of Métis people as Aboriginal peoples in Canada (as recognized and affirmed in Section 35 of the Constitution Act, 1982). The MNA currently has over 50,000 registered citizens.

The MNA is divided into six regions across Alberta, each with its own president and VP:

Métis Settlements General Council
 
The Métis of Alberta are the only Métis in Canada to have a negotiated and legislated land base. The land was granted by Letters Patent in 1990 and is held collectively in fee simple through the Métis Settlements General Council, the only governing political assembly of the Metis Territories.

The eight Settlements are:

See also
 Mobile diabetes screening initiative

Notes

References

Further reading

 Barkwell, Lawrence J., Leah Dorion, and Audreen Hourie. Métis legacy Michif culture, heritage, and folkways. Métis legacy series, v. 2. Saskatoon: Gabriel Dumont Institute, 2006. 
 Barkwell, Lawrence J., Leah Dorion and Darren Prefontaine. "Metis Legacy: A Historiography and Annotated Bibliography". Winnipeg: Pemmican Publications Inc. and Saskatoon: Gabriel Dumont Institute, 2001. 
 Bell, Catherine Edith. Alberta's Metis Settlements Legislation An Overview of Ownership and Management of Settlements Lands. Regina, Sask., Canada: Canadian Plains Research Center, University of Regina, 1994. 
 Driben, Paul. We Are Metis The Ethnography of a Halfbreed Community in Northern Alberta. Immigrant communities & ethnic minorities in the United States & Canada, 2. New York: AMS Press, 1985. 
 Gordon, Naomi, and Maria King. Voices of Courage Alberta Métis Veterans Remembered. 2006. 
 Pocklington, T. C. The Government and Politics of the Alberta Metis Settlements. Regina, Sask., Canada: Canadian Plains Research Center, University of Regina, 1991. 
 Sawchuk, Joe. The Dynamics of Native Politics The Alberta Metis Experience. Purich's Aboriginal issues series. Saskatoon: Purich Pub, 1998.

External links
 Métis Nation of Alberta
 Métis Regional Council zone IV
 Métis Settlements General Council

Métis organizations
Métis in Alberta
Indigenous rights organizations in Canada
Indigenous organizations in Alberta
1932 establishments in Alberta